The Communist Youth of Austria (abbr.: KJÖ) is an independent Marxist–Leninist Youth Organization.

History

The Communist Youth was founded in 1918 as the Youth Organization of the Communist Party of Austria. When Dollfuss came into Power in 1934, the Communist Youth became the most important antifascist youth movement in Austria. 250 Members of the Communist Youth joined the International Brigades.

After the Anschluss in 1938, conditions for the Communist Youth got worse again. Many members were arrested, executed or murdered in concentration camps. Nevertheless, the Communist Youth published handbills against war and nazism and some of its members joined guerilla groups and fought against the Nazi regime.

In 1945, the Free Austrian Youth (FÖJ) was founded by communists, socialists and Catholics to build up a free and democratic Austria.

In 1970, the FÖJ broke up because of ideological conflicts and the Communist Youth was re-established.

Today
Nowadays, the Communist Youth fights against war, neofascism, the Austrian membership in the EU and cuts in social welfare.

Since 2004 the Communist Youth is an independent organisation.

On February 16, 2007, American celebrity Paris Hilton was in Vienna for an autograph session in a mall when she had to be rushed offstage because members of the Communist Youth began throwing tubes of lipstick and lit cigarettes at her. They also distributed fliers explaining the reason of the protest.

In 2008 the KJÖ dismissed the former addendum "Youth Left" in its name and was admitted to the Styrian youth advisory council.

References

External links
Communist Youth of Austria (in German)
English Part of the KJÖ-Homepage

Communist Party of Austria
Youth wings of political parties in Austria
Youth wings of communist parties